NASM may refer to:

 National Academy of Sports Medicine, an American organisation
 Netwide Assembler, a free x86 assembler
 National Air and Space Museum, a Smithsonian museum in Washington, D.C. and Virginia, US
 National Association of Schools of Music, US
 Holland America Line, formerly the Nederlandsch-Amerikaansche Stoomvaart-Maatschappij (Netherlands-American Steamship Company)